MS Sailor is a Ro-Ro ship owned by the Estonian shipping company Tallink. The ship is operated by Tallink, between Kapellskär and Paldiski. Sailor is registered under the Estonian flag and its home port is Tallinn.

History 
At the end of October 1986, the ship was launched. On May 12, 1987, Doris Sundström christened the ship Finnsailor. In October of the following year, Neste took ownership of the vessel and registered it under the Finnish flag. Naantali became the home port. After this, Finncarriers started traffic with it between Helsinki and Lübeck . On January 26, 1989, Partrederi Finnsailor bought the ship. The home port remained Helsinki. In March 1994, Finnlines bought Finnsailor. 

On February 20, 2007, Finnlink started service with Finnsailor between Naantali and Kapellskär. On November 1, 2007, the Belgian company Finnlines Belgium bought the ship. Sweden continued to be the flag state. Sailor was acquired by Tallink in 2020.

References

External links 
 Ms Sailor on Tallink's website

1987 ships
Ferries of Estonia